The 2015–16 North Carolina A&T Aggies men's basketball team represented North Carolina Agricultural and Technical State University during the 2015–16 NCAA Division I men's basketball season. The Aggies were led by fourth-year head coach Cy Alexander. Alexander resigned as head on January 26, 2016. Assistant coach Jay Joyner took over on interim basis. They played their home games at the Corbett Sports Center and were members of the Mid-Eastern Athletic Conference. They finished the season 10–22, 7–9 record in MEAC play to finish in a three-way tie for sixth place. They lost to Coppin State in the first round of the MEAC tournament.

On March 7, the interim tag was removed and Joyner was named head coach.

Previous season 
The Aggies finished the season 9-23, 6-10 in MEAC play to finish in tenth place. On July 10, 2015, it was announced that Jamal Brown was hired as an assistant coach.

Departures

Class of 2015 signees

Roster

Schedule

|-
!colspan=9 style="background:#002659; color:#FFBC00;"| Regular season

|-
!colspan=9 style="background:#002659; color:#FFBC00;"| MEAC tournament

References

North Carolina A&T Aggies men's basketball seasons
North Carolina
2015 in sports in North Carolina
2016 in sports in North Carolina